Rae Linda Brown (October 7, 1953 – August 20, 2017) was an American musicologist.

As a scholar, archivist and editor Rae Linda Brown conducted research on topics in American classical music, Black Music and African-American classical music. Brown authored books and academic treatises on Florence Price and William Grant Still. As a professor and administrator Brown led in the creation of new academic programs at the University of California, Irvine, Loyola Marymount University, and Pacific Lutheran University. Brown wrote the groundbreaking biography, Heart of a Woman: The Life and Music of Florence B. Price, which was published in 2020.

Brown grew up in Hartford Connecticut and earned degrees at the University of Connecticut and Yale University. Some of Brown's graduate work at Yale catalogued sheet music and scores in the James Weldon Johnson memorial collection at the Beinecke Rare Book & Manuscript Library and comprises Volume 23 of the Garland Critical Studies on Black Life and Culture.

Brown's 1987 dissertation focused on composer Florence Price. Throughout the 1980s, 1990s and 2000s Brown rediscovered, edited, and published critical analyses of Florence Price's music. Brown's work in this area became the basis for a wider recognition of Price's role in and contribution to American music. This recognition contributed to the discovery of previously unknown scores that are now housed at the University of Arkansas.

Brown was a professor at University of Michigan and The University of California, Irvine. While at Irvine, Brown served as the Robert and Marjorie Rawlins Chair of the Department of Music, oversaw completion of a new building for the department, the development of new academic programs in jazz, and the creation of a doctoral program in  Integrated Composition, Improvisation, and Technology. From 2008-2015 Brown was the Vice President for Undergraduate Education at Loyola Marymount University; from 2016 until her death Brown was the Provost and Senior Vice President for Academic Affairs at Pacific Lutheran University. In 2017 Brown received the inaugural Willis C. Patterson Research Award for her work in the area of African-American Art Song.

References 

1953 births
2017 deaths
American musicologists
University of Michigan faculty
Yale University alumni
University of Connecticut alumni
American women academics
African-American academics
People from Hartford, Connecticut
American academic administrators
Pacific Lutheran University faculty
University of California, Irvine faculty
Loyola Marymount University faculty
Women academic administrators
20th-century African-American people
21st-century African-American people
20th-century African-American women
21st-century African-American women